Graham Colin Swift FRSL (born 4 May 1949) is an English writer. Born in London, England, he was educated at Dulwich College, London, Queens' College, Cambridge, and later the University of York.

Career 
Some of Swift's books have been filmed, including Waterland (1992), Shuttlecock (1993), Last Orders (1996) and Mothering Sunday (2021). His novel Last Orders was joint-winner of the 1996 James Tait Black Memorial Prize for fiction and a controversial winner of the 1996 Booker Prize, owing to the many similarities in plot and structure to William Faulkner's As I Lay Dying.

The prize-winning Waterland is set in The Fens. A novel of landscape, history and family, it is often cited as one of the outstanding post-war British novels and has been a set text on the English literature syllabus in British schools. Writer Patrick McGrath asked Swift about the "feeling for magic" in Waterland during an interview. Swift responded that "The phrase everybody comes up with is magic realism, which I think has now become a little tired. But on the other hand there’s no doubt that English writers of my generation have been very much influenced by writers from outside who in one way or another have got this magical, surreal quality, such as Borges, Márquez, Grass, and that that has been stimulating. I think in general it’s been a good thing. Because we are, as ever, terribly parochial, self-absorbed and isolated, culturally, in this country. It’s about time we began to absorb things from outside."

Swift was acquainted with Ted Hughes and has himself published poetry, some of which is included in Making an Elephant: Writing from Within (2009).

List of works

Novels
The Sweet-Shop Owner (1980)
Shuttlecock (1981) – winner of the 1983 Geoffrey Faber Memorial Prize
Waterland (1983) – shortlisted for Booker Prize
Out of this World (1988)
Ever After (1992)
Last Orders (1996) – winner of the 1996 Booker Prize
The Light of Day (2003) – long listed for the Man Booker Prize. 
Tomorrow (2007)
Wish You Were Here (2011)
Mothering Sunday (2016) 
Here We Are (2020)

Nonfiction
Making an Elephant: Writing from Within (2009)

Short story collections
Learning to Swim and Other Stories (1982)
England and Other Stories (2014)

Short stories
 
 
 "Hinges". The New Yorker. 14 November 2022.

Adaptations 
Waterland was adapted into a film of the same name in 1992. The film was directed by Stephen Gyllenhaal and starred Ethan Hawke, Jeremy Irons, and Sinéad Cusack.

Swift's novel Mothering Sunday was adapted into a film in 2021, starring Olivia Colman and Colin Firth and featuring Glenda Jackson.

References

External links
 2007 audio interview with Graham Swift on the topic of 'The Light of Day', conducted by John Mullan
The Papers of Graham Swift at the British Library
Supplementary Graham Swift papers at the British Library
Graham Swift on Last Orders, 25 years on: 'I wasn't born a writer - I had to become one'
The Guardian, John O'Mahony on the unassuming Booker prizewinner who specialises in the heroism of drab lives
The Guardian, Interview 'How did I end up becoming a novelist?'
The Fiction of Graham Swift - 2002 Thesis by Anastasia Logotheti

1949 births
Living people
20th-century British short story writers
20th-century English male writers
20th-century English novelists
21st-century British short story writers
21st-century English male writers
21st-century English novelists
Alumni of Queens' College, Cambridge
Alumni of the University of York
Booker Prize winners
English male novelists
English male short story writers
English short story writers
Fellows of the Royal Society of Literature
James Tait Black Memorial Prize recipients
The New Yorker people
People educated at Dulwich College
Postmodern writers
Writers from London